Comtesse Anaïs Perrière-Pilte (Anais Marcelli; born Anne Laure Joséphine Hure; 1809 – December 1878) was a French composer noted for theatrical works who often used the pseudonym "Anais Marcelli." She usually wrote her own libretti, and had a theatre built in her home to produce opera. She died in Paris.

Works
Selected works include:
Jaloux de soi 1873	operetta	
Le sorcier	1866 operetta	
Le talon d'Achille	1875 operetta	
Les vacances de l'Amour 1867 opéra comique

References

1809 births
1878 deaths
19th-century classical composers
French music educators
French classical composers
French women classical composers
French opera composers
19th-century French composers
Women opera composers
Women music educators
19th-century women composers